Eremobiotus is a genus of tardigrade in the class Eutardigrada.

Species
 Eremobiotus alicatai (Binda 1969)
 Eremobiotus ovezovae Biserov, 1992

References

External links

Parachaela
Tardigrade genera
Extremophiles